Protocadherin-20 is a protein that in humans is encoded by the PCDH20 gene.

This gene belongs to the protocadherin gene family, a subfamily of the cadherin superfamily. This gene encodes a protein which contains 6 extracellular cadherin domains, a transmembrane domain and a cytoplasmic tail differing from those of the classical cadherins. Although its specific function is undetermined, the cadherin-related neuronal receptor is thought to play a role in the establishment and function of specific cell-cell connections in the brain.

References

Further reading